The Suffolk Championships was an open tennis tournament for both men and women held at Saxmundham, Suffolk, England from 1883 to 1968.

History
On 12 August 1883 an annual open Saxmundham Lawn Tennis Tournament was established at Hurts Hall Park, Saxmundham, Suffolk, England that ran until 1893. that was a featured event on the Men's 1883 Tennis Tour. The winner of the first men's singles title was William Bolding Monement who defeated J.M. Wilkinson in straight sets. 

In 1884 the women's singles event was won by Miss M. Marriott who beat Miss G. Rant in two straight sets.  In 1894 the event was renamed the Suffolk Championships, the first official winners of the men's single title was Mr Rupert L. Hamblin-Smith, and the  women's singles tile Miss Alice Simpson Pickering. In 1914 the championships staged by Saxmundham Lawn Tennis club moved from Hurts Hall Park to the cricket gounds of Framlingham College where it was played until the out break of World War Two in 1939. 

In the men's singles event Herbert Roper Barrett was the most successful player he won 17 titles, out of 18 finals between 1898 and 1921 which remains today an all time record for most finals at a single tennis tournament.

References

Defunct tennis tournaments in the United Kingdom
Grass court tennis tournaments
Tennis tournaments in England